Alfaguara may refer to:
Alfaguara, a Spanish-language book publisher based in Madrid
Alfaguara project, a blue whale conservation project in the northwest of Isla de Chiloé, southern Chile
Sierra de la Alfaguara, a mountain range in the Cordillera Subbética in southern Spain
Arboretum La Alfaguara, a public park in the Sierra de la Alfaguara, in Alfacar near Granada in Spain